Faber is the Latin word for "smith". Like a few other Latin occupational names (e.g. Agricola for farmer, Nauta for sailor), it was adopted as a surname in the Low Countries and Germany. It is also common in England, perhaps due to Norman French influence. Notable people with the surname include:

Adele Faber (born 1928), American author on parenting
Andreas Faber-Kaiser (1944–1994), Spanish writer of German descent
Antonius Faber (1557–1624), Savoisian nobleman and jurist
Armin Faber (c. 1916 – c. 2000), German World War II pilot
Aschwin Wildeboer Faber (born 1986), Spanish swimmer of Dutch origin
Ate Faber (1894–1962), Dutch fencer
Basil Faber (1520–1576), Lutheran theologian
Brock Faber (born 2002), American ice hockey player
Carla Faber (born 1971), Dutch art historian and politician
Caroline Faber (1923-2016), English peer, daughter of PM Harold Macmillan
Christian Wilhelm von Faber du Faur (1780–1857), Württemberg painter and army officer
Claire Faber (born 1998), Luxembourgian racing cyclist
Dave Faber (born 1975), Canadian singer and guitarist of Faber Drive
David Faber (1928–2015), Polish Holocaust survivor
David A. Faber (born 1942), United States federal judge
David Faber (born 1950), American master printer
David Faber (born 1961), British schoolmaster, formerly a politician
David Faber (born 1964), American market news analyst
Denison Faber, 1st Baron Wittenham (1852–1931), British peer
Donna Faber (born 1971), American tennis player
Edmund Faber, 1st Baron Faber (1847–1920), British Conservative politician
Eli Faber (1943-2020), American historian
Elmar Faber (1934-2017), German book publisher
Emmanuel Faber (born 1964), French CEO
Erik Faber (born 1977), Norwegian pop/rock singer-songwriter
Ernest Faber (born 1971), Dutch footballer
Erwin Faber (1891–1989), Austrian actor
Eugeniusz Faber (1939–2021), Polish footballer
Felix Faber (1441–1502), Swiss/German Dominican theologian
Floreta Faber (born 1968), Albanian ambassador to the United States
François Faber (1887–1915), Luxembourgian cyclist
Frands Faber (1897–1933), Danish field hockey player
Frédéric Théodore Faber (1782–1844), Belgian landscape and genre painter
Frederick William Faber (1814–1863), British hymn writer and theologian
Frederik Faber (1796–1828), Danish ornithologist
Gastón Faber (born 1996), Uruguayan footballer
Geke Faber (born 1952), Dutch politician
Geoffrey Faber (1889–1961), British academic, publisher and poet, founder of Faber and Faber Limited
Georg Faber (1877–1966), German mathematician
George Henry Faber (1839–1910), British insurance underwriter and Liberal Party politician
George S. J. Faber (born 1959), co-founder of British production company Company Pictures
George Stanley Faber (1773–1854), Anglican theologian
Giovanni Faber né Johann Faber (1574–1629), German papal doctor, botanist, and member of the Accademia dei Lincei 
Gordon Faber (1930–2014), American politician, in Oregon
Heike Faber (born 1965), German actress
Heinrich Faber (before 1500–1552), German music theorist, composer, and Kantor
Horst Faber (born 1910s), German figure skater
Jack Faber (1903–1994), American microbiologist and lacrosse coach 
Jacob Faber (fl. 1516 – c. 1550), French artist and publisher (active in Switzerland), easily confused with:
Jacob Faber Stapulensis (c. 1455 – c. 1536), French Renaissance humanist and theologian
Jacob Faber of Deventer (1473 – c. 1517), Dutch Renaissance humanist
Jared Faber, American musician, composer and producer
Jean-Paul Faber (born 1930), French sports shooter
Jeannette Faber (born 1982), American long-distance runner
Jelle Faber (1924–2004), Dutch-Canadian theologian
Joachim Faber (born 1950), German lawyer and business executive
Johan Adam Faber (1692–1759), Flemish composer
Johann Faber (1478–1541), German Catholic theologian
Johann Faber of Heilbronn (1504–1558), German Catholic preacher
Johann Augustanus Faber (1470–1531), Swiss theologian
Johann Joachim Faber (1778–1846) German landscape painter
John Faber the Elder (c. 1660 – 1721), Dutch portrait engraver active in London
John Faber the Younger (1684–1756), Dutch portrait painter active in London
John Faber, Kansas politician
John Eberhard Faber (1822–1879), German-born American pencil manufacturer 
Jules Faber, Australian cartoonist and illustrator
Julian Faber (1917–2002), British insurance businessman
Karl Faber (1773–1853), German historian
Kaspar Faber  (1730–1784), German founder of the stationery company Faber-Castell
Katherine Faber, American researcher
Keith Faber (born 1966), American (Ohio) politician 
Klaas Carel Faber (1922–2012), Dutch collaborator with the Nazis
Leslie Faber (1879–1929), English stage actor
Linda Faber (born 1960), Dutch freestyle swimmer
Lo Faber (born 1966), American guitarist and songwriter
Lothar von Faber (1817–1896), German industrialist, born Lothar Faber
Lucien Faber (born 1952), Luxembourgian racewalker
Lykele Faber (1919–2009), Dutch commando and radio operator during World War II
Marc Faber (born 1946), Swiss economist and investor
Marcus Faber (born 1984), German politician
Marjolein Faber (born 1960), Dutch politician
Mark Faber (1950–1991), English cricketer
Martin Hermann Faber (1586–1648), German painter, architect, and cartographer
Mary Faber (1798-1857), African slave trader
Mary Faber (born 1979), American singer, actress, and dancer
Mary Eliza Faber (1850–1936), English novelist and non-fiction writer
Matthew Faber, (1973–2020), American television actor
Matthias Faber (1587–1653), German Jesuist priest
Michael Faber (1929–2015), British economist
Michael Faber (born 1995), German footballer
Michel Faber (born 1960), Dutch novelist
Oscar Faber (1886–1956), British structural engineer
Olaf Wildeboer Faber (born 1983), Spanish swimmer of Dutch origin
Pamela Faber (born 1950), American/Spanish linguist
Patrick Faber (born 1964), Dutch field hockey player
Patrick Faber (born 1978), Belizean politician
St. Peter Faber (1506–1546), co-founder of the Society of Jesus
Peter Faber (1810–1877), Danish songwriter, photographer and telegraphy expert
Peter Faber (born 1943), Dutch film and television actor
Philip Faber (1564–1630), Italian Franciscan theologian and philosopher
Phyllis M. Faber (born 1927), American botanist
Pierre Faber (born 1978), German rugby union player
Rasmus Faber (born 1979), Swedish DJ, pianist and music producer
Red Faber (1888–1976), American baseball pitcher 
Roland Faber (born 1960), American theologian
Samantha "Sam" Faber (born 1987), American ice hockey player
Sandra Faber (born 1944), American astronomer
Simon Faber (born 1968), German politician and mayor
Steve Faber, American screenwriter
Tanaquil Faber (1615–1672), French classical scholar
Tobias Faber (1915–2010), Danish architect
Toos Faber-de Heer (1929-2020), Dutch TV presenter and civil servant
Urijah Faber (born 1979), American mixed martial arts fighter
Vance Faber (born 1944), American mathematician
Walter Vavasour Faber (1857–1928), English  Conservative politician and soldier
Wenzel Faber (1455–1518), Bohemian astronomer, astrologer and theologian
William F. Faber (bishop) (1860–1934), American Episcopalian bishop
William F. Faber (politician) (1858-1951), American politician

Fictional characters:
Faber, a former professor in Fahrenheit 451
Emil Faber, Founder of Faber College in the film Animal House
Henry Faber, German spy in the Ken Follett novel Eye of the Needle
Jacky Faber, female protagonist in the novel Bloody Jack and its sequels
Mike Faber, character in Homeland (TV series)
Daniel Aurifaber (Goldsmith), character in The Sanctuary Sparrow, a Cadfael novel by Ellis Peters

Latin-language surnames
Occupational surnames
Surnames of Dutch origin
Surnames of German origin
Dutch-language surnames
German-language surnames
English-language surnames